Ceremony for the 20th Hong Kong Film Awards was held on 29 April 2001 in the Hong Kong Cultural Centre and hosted by Eric Tsang, Carol Cheng, Gigi Leung and Eric Ng. Eighteen winners in eighteen categories were unveiled. The year's biggest winner was Crouching Tiger, Hidden Dragon, which received eight awards, one award short of the record set by Comrades: Almost a Love Story in 1997. Besides the sixteen regular categories, the 20th Hong Kong Film Awards also presented two special awards, Lifetime Achievement Award and Professional Achievement Award, to veteran actress Pak Suet Sin and action choreographer Yuen Wo Ping respectively.

The nominees were announced on 7 March 2001. Over eighty nominees were in a contest for sixteen award categories. The front runners were Crouching Tiger, Hidden Dragon and In the Mood for Love, with sixteen and twelve nominations respectively.

Awards
Winners are listed first, highlighted in boldface, and indicated with a double dagger.

References

External links
 Official website of the Hong Kong Film Awards

2001
2000 film awards
2001 in Hong Kong
Hong